Bobrovo is a rural locality (a village) in Koskogorskoye Rural Settlement of Primorsky District, Arkhangelsk Oblast, Russia. The population was 29 as of 2010. There are 3 streets.

Geography 
Bobrovo is located 43 km southeast of Arkhangelsk (the district's administrative centre) by road. Bobrovo (settlement) is the nearest rural locality.

References 

Rural localities in Primorsky District, Arkhangelsk Oblast